Milan Damjanović (15 October 1943 – 23 May 2006) was a Yugoslavian and Serbian football defender.

At an international level, he played seven matches for the Yugoslav national team and was a participant at Euro 1968.

He also had a coaching career mainly in France, Zambia and Yugoslavia. His nickname was Gica.

References
 
 
 Reprezentacija.rs profile 

1943 births
2006 deaths
Sportspeople from Knin
Serbs of Croatia
Association football defenders
Serbian footballers
Serbian football managers
Yugoslav footballers
Yugoslavia international footballers
UEFA Euro 1968 players
Yugoslav football managers
FK Partizan players
Yugoslav First League players
Angers SCO players
Le Mans FC players
Ligue 1 players
Serbian expatriate footballers
Yugoslav expatriate footballers
Expatriate footballers in France